Abderrahim Ouakili (born 12 December 1970) is a Moroccan former professional footballer who played for several German teams, including 1. FSV Mainz 05, TSV 1860 Munich, Tennis Borussia Berlin and Karlsruher SC while also having a spell with Skoda Xanthi F.C. in the Greek Super League.

He played for Morocco national football team and was a participant at the 1998 FIFA World Cup.

References

External links 
 
 

1970 births
Living people
Moroccan footballers
Association football midfielders
Footballers from Rabat
Morocco international footballers
1998 FIFA World Cup players
1998 African Cup of Nations players
Bundesliga players
2. Bundesliga players
Super League Greece players
TGM SV Jügesheim players
1. FSV Mainz 05 players
TSV 1860 Munich players
Tennis Borussia Berlin players
Xanthi F.C. players
Karlsruher SC players
Expatriate footballers in Greece
Expatriate footballers in Germany
Moroccan expatriate footballers
Moroccan expatriate sportspeople in Germany
Moroccan expatriate sportspeople in Greece